Lasiocaryum is a genus of flowering plants belonging to the family Boraginaceae.

Its native range is Himalaya to Southern Central China.

Species:

Lasiocaryum densiflorum 
Lasiocaryum munroi 
Lasiocaryum trichocarpum

References

Boraginoideae
Boraginaceae genera